Yeniçağa is a town in Bolu Province in the Black Sea region of Turkey, 38 km from the town of Bolu, on the Otoyul 4 highway from Istanbul to Ankara. It is the seat of Yeniçağa District. Its population is 4,625 (2021). Elevation is about 1200 m. The mayor is Recai Çağlar (AKP).

Yeniçağa is a small town providing basic infrastructure to the surrounding countryside, and successive generations have migrated to large cities in Turkey or abroad in search of jobs and careers. There are a large number of roadside restaurants, gas stations and repair shops along the old E5 Istanbul highway, these are mainly used by trucks as cars zoom by on the newer TEM motorway. Yeniçağa Lake is a popular spot for picnics under the trees on the lakeshore.
There is an annual country fair (panayır).

References

Populated places in Bolu Province
Yeniçağa District
Towns in Turkey